Flexing with Monty is a 2010 comedy-drama film starring Trevor Goddard, Rudi Davis and Sally Kirkland. Shooting started in 1994 and was finally completed in 2008 during which both the film's male lead (Trevor Goddard), and the original producer died.

Plot
Monty, a physical education instructor at a local university, lives with his teenage brother, Bertin, whom he has raised alone. Monty is obsessed with body building and he compulsively works out every day. Lilith, a mysterious woman, enters the brothers' lives and she pits Monty against Bertin, forcing the two brothers into conflict.

Cast
 Trevor Goddard as Monty
 Rudi Davis as Bertin
 Sally Kirkland as Lillith
 Mitch Hara as a gay man
 Michelle Zeitlin as a hooker
 Manny Gates as the caged man
 Gwen Van Dam as Granny

References

External links
 

2010 comedy films
2010 drama films
2010 films
American comedy-drama films
American horror films
American LGBT-related films
American mystery films
2010s English-language films
Incest in film
LGBT-related horror films
2010 LGBT-related films
2010s American films